The 1916 United States Senate election in Tennessee was held on November 7, 1916. Incumbent Democratic Senator Luke Lea ran for re-election to a second term, but was defeated for the Democratic nomination by U.S. Representative Kenneth McKellar. McKellar won the general election against Republican Governor of Tennessee Ben W. Hooper.

This was the first popular election for U.S. Senator held in Tennessee, following the ratification of the Seventeenth Amendment to the United States Constitution. McKellar would go on to serve six terms in the Senate, becoming one of the longest serving members of either house of Congress.

Democratic primary

Candidates
Luke Lea, incumbent Senator since 1911
Kenneth McKellar, U.S. Representative from Memphis
Malcolm R. Patterson, former Governor of Tennessee (1907–11)

Results
In the initial primary, held in November 1915, McKellar finished first, carrying both East and West Tennessee. His support in East Tennessee came on the back of Senator John Knight Shields, who controlled federal patronage in the state and assigned federal employees to campaign on McKellar's behalf. Patterson finished second, carrying Central Tennessee. Senator Lea was eliminated.

In a runoff, McKellar increased his margin over Patterson.

General election

Candidates
Ben W. Hooper, former Governor of Tennessee (1911–15) (Republican)
H. H. Magnum (Socialist)
Kenneth McKellar, U.S. Representative from Memphis

Results

See also
1916 United States Senate elections

References

1916
Tennessee
United States Senate